RIZ, also as RIZ-Odašiljači is a Croatian electronics company headquartered in Zagreb. It was founded in 1948 as Radio Industrija Zagreb. It began manufacturing radios, gramophones, television sets, electrical components (transistors, integrated circuits, capacitors) as well as military transmission devices. Currently, it only manufactures transmitters, antennas and electronic electricity meters. They manufactured the first TV in Yugoslavia, TV 101, from a licence by Philips in 1955.

Recent developments
Their transmitters are used, among others, by the BBC, South Korean Government and national broadcaster Korean Broadcasting System and the US army.

A joint-venture with the Ethiopian government for the construction of a factory was planned but was scrapped as late as 2014.

References

External links
Official website

Manufacturing companies based in Zagreb
Electronics companies established in 1948
1948 establishments in Yugoslavia
Electronics companies of Croatia